Teófilo Otoni is a municipality in northeast Minas Gerais state, Brazil. The population of the municipality was 140,937 in 2020 and the area is 3,242.818 km2.

Origin of the name
The city is named after  (Vila do Príncipe, 27 January 1807 - Rio de Janeiro, 17 October 1869), who was a provincial deputy representing Minas Gerais; a national deputy and a senator in the Empire of Brazil from 1864 to 1869; and founder of the city of the same name.

Geography
It lies at an elevation of 319 meters on the Todos os Santos River, a tributary of the Mucuri. It is part of the Valley of the Mucuri, a region which includes 27 municipalities. Situated on the Rio-Bahia Interstate Highway BR 116, it is 130 km. north of the regional center, Governador Valadares, on the Doce River, and 478 km north of the state capital, Belo Horizonte. It was founded in 1853 by German colonists and given city status in 1878.

Municipal boundaries are with:
 North: Novo Oriente de Minas and Itaipé
 South: Ouro Verde de Minas, Ataléia, Frei Gaspar and Itambacuri
 East: Pavão and Carlos Chagas
 West: Poté and Ladainha

Distances to important cities:
 Belo Horizonte: 450 km
 Brasília: 1,162 km
 Rio de Janeiro: 730 km
 Salvador: 900 km
 São Paulo: 1,050 km
 Vitória: 550 km

Statistical region
According to the modern (2017) geographic classification by Brazil's National Institute of Geography and Statistics (IBGE), the city is the main municipality in the Intermediate Geographic Region of Teófilo Otoni.

Until 2017, Teófilo Otoni used to be a statistical microregion including the following municipalities: Ataléia, Catuji, Franciscópolis, Frei Gaspar, Itaipé, Ladainha, Malacacheta, Novo Oriente de Minas, Ouro Verde de Minas, Pavão, Poté, Setubinha, and Teófilo Otoni. The population of this region was 253,679 in 2000 and the area was 11,296.80 km2 (roughly the size of The Gambia and a little larger than Jamaica. The population density was 22.46 inhabitants/km2.

Economy
Teófilo Otoni is a trade centre for an agricultural hinterland in which livestock raising is of some importance. The city has small-scale manufacturing and food-processing plants. Poor soils for agriculture and lack of industry have made Teófilo Otoni a major source of immigration to other regions of Brazil. In 2005 the GDP was R$723 million, of which 515 million was from services, 101 was from industry, and 37 million was from agriculture. Industry employed about 2,000 workers, services employed 8,800 workers, and public administration employed 2,300 workers.

Téofilo Otoni's strongest economic sector is a diverse and bustling service industry. The city has several commercial areas and a shopping mall, City Mall. Prominent businesses in Teófilo Otoni include Pharmacy Indiana, Stationery Graffite, the store Magda Magazin, and Ramos Transport. The trade in precious stones is also quite important as the city is considered an International Capital of Precious Stones, which comprises a good portion of its economy.

In October 1994, government of Brazil created an Export Processing Zone of 14.31 hectares in Teófilo Otoni, attracting several industries since then.

The city was granted the FIPP (International Fair of Precious Stones) recognized worldwide.

The city is served by Kemil Kumaira Airport.

Agricultural Data
 Cattle herd: 177,000 (2006)
 Rural producers: 2,422
 Agricultural area: 337,062 hectares
 Planted area: 13,200 ha.
 Natural pasture land: 125,506 ha.
 Persons working in agriculture: 7,000
 Tractors: 149
 Main crops: bananas, coffee, oranges, tangerines, and sugarcane

Mining
Extensive mining and gem trading for aquamarines, topaz, brazilianite, and various forms of quartz take place there. A Gem and Mineral Show (Feira Internacional de Pedras Preciosas (FIPP), is held here every year, attracting international buyers. The fair provides the opportunity to buy both rough and cut stones directly from local producers, miners and cutters.

Health and education
The population was served by 61 health clinics and 4 hospitals (417 beds in 2005). There were several institutes of higher education: Faculdade de Tecnologia Egídio José da Silva (private), Instituto de Ensino Superior Integrado (private), Instituto de Educação Superior São Francisco de Assis de Teófilo Otoni (private philanthropic), Faculdades Unificadas Doctum de Teófilo Ottoni (private), a campus of the Federal University of Vales do Jequitinhonha  and Mucuri - UFVJM (public) and a campus of the Federal Institute of Northern Minas Gerais - IFNMG (public).

Municipal Human Development Index
 MHDI: .742 (2000)
 State ranking: 343 out of 853 municipalities
 National ranking: 2,097 out of 5,138 municipalities
 Life expectancy: 69
 Literacy rate: 81

Notable people
Aécio Cunha, politician
Bruno Barros di Pietro, footballer
Fahel, footballer
Félix Guisard, businessman
Fred, footballer
Wernonn Ramalho, businessman  
Nilmário Miranda, politician
Tristão Ferreira da Cunha, politician

See also
 List of municipalities in Minas Gerais
 Roman Catholic Diocese of Teófilo Otoni
 1985 hailstorm in eastern Minas Gerais

References

Municipalities in Minas Gerais